The United Arab Emirates men's national under-18 ice hockey team is the men's national under-18 ice hockey team of the United Arab Emirates. The team is controlled by the UAE Ice Sports Federation, a member of the International Ice Hockey Federation.

History
The United Arab Emirates men's national under-18 ice hockey team played its first game in 2012 during the 2012 IIHF U18 Challenge Cup of Asia being held in Abu Dhabi, United Arab Emirates. The United Arab Emirates finished in second place after winning their games against Hong Kong, India and Malaysia, only losing their fourth game against Thailand. Their opening game was against India which they won 31–1 was recorded as their largest ever win in international competition.

International competitions
2012 IIHF U18 Challenge Cup of Asia. Finish: 2nd

References

External links
United Arab Emirates Ice Hockey Association

Ice hockey in the United Arab Emirates
National under-18 ice hockey teams
Ice hockey